Tariq Khan may refer to:

 Tariq Khan (actor) (born 1951), Indian actor from Bollywood
 Tariq Khan (general), Pakistan Army general
 Tariq Khan (Guantanamo detainee), Pakistani held first by an Afghan warlord and then in Guantanamo Bay
 Tariq Azim Khan, Pakistani politician
 Tariq Kamal Khan (born 1930), Pakistani military official
 Tariq Pervez Khan (1948–2020), Chief Justice of the Peshawar High Court, Pakistan
 Tariq Umar Khan (born 1976), Indian production designer, art director, and film director